The Commander-in-Chief of the Russian Air Force is the chief commanding authority of the Russian Air Force. He is appointed by the President of Russia. The position dates to the Russian Revolution in 1917.

List of Commanders

Chief of the Air Service of the Russian Republic

Chief of the Air Force of the Red Army

Commander-in-Chief of the Soviet Air Force

Commander-in-Chief of the Commonwealth of Independent States' Air Force

Commander-in-Chief of the Russian Air Force

Commander of the Air Force – Deputy Commander-in-Chief of the Aerospace Forces

Notes

References

Russia
Military of Russia
Military of the Soviet Union
Commanders-in-chief of the Russian Air Force